Help Me Help You is an American sitcom television series created by Jennifer Konner and Alexandra Rushfield that aired from September 26, 2006 to December 12, 2006. It was first broadcast at 9:30pm Tuesdays on ABC in the United States and on Global in Canada. Help Me Help You was a comedy about a collection of eccentric individuals in group psychotherapy with a respected therapist—who may quite possibly have more problems than his patients.

The series was pulled from the schedule on December 14, 2006.

On May 15, 2007, ABC canceled the series after one season.

Cast

Regulars
Ted Danson as Dr. Bill Hoffman, a brilliant therapist with a huge ego and a failed marriage.
Jere Burns as Michael, a high-powered executive with anger issues, in court-ordered therapy.
Darlene Hunt as Darlene, a woman with constant need of approval, secretly in an affair with Michael but obsessed with Dr. Hoffman.
Charlie Finn as Dave, a man who tried to kill himself in his office because no one likes him.
Suzy Nakamura as Inger, a deeply lonely woman with a complete lack of social skills.
Jim Rash as Jonathan, a married gay man in denial.
Jane Kaczmarek as Anne Hoffman, Bill's estranged wife. (6 episodes)

Recurring
Jane Lynch as Raquel Janes, a therapist, part of Dr. Hoffman's "therapy for therapists" group.
Philip Rosenthal as Phil, a therapist, part of Dr. Hoffman's "therapy for therapists" group.
Judd Apatow as Judd, a therapist, part of Dr. Hoffman's "therapy for therapists" group.
Larry Wilmore as Larry, a therapist, part of Dr. Hoffman's "therapy for therapists" group.
Lindsay Sloane as Sasha, Bill's daughter with deep-rooted daddy issues.
Brenda Strong as Linda, Dr. Hoffman's new neighbor and romantic interest.
Thomas F. Wilson as Kenny, a car salesman and Anne's new boyfriend.
Meredith Roberts as Francesca, the girl at work Dave is in love with.
Kathleen Rose Perkins as Jocelyn, Jonathan's Wife.
Bruce Altman as Ira, Sasha's much, bada boyfriend and a huge fan of Dr. Bill Hoffman's.
Mykel Shannon Jenkins as Shannon, a coffee barista Jonathan seems to find attractive.
Tim Meadows as Petey, a colleague of Dr. Hoffman's who he shares a practice with.
Toby Huss as Lenny, a patient of Petey's.
Michael Cotter as Glen, a young man Inger meets on JDate and whom she becomes obsessed over.

Notable guests
 Kevin Hart as Kevin, a boxer who has trouble finding the anger to fight (episode "Raging Bill").
 Seth Rogen as Seth (episode "Working Woman").

Episodes

International broadcasters

External links
 
 TV Series Finale - article on series cancellation

American Broadcasting Company original programming
2006 American television series debuts
2006 American television series endings
2000s American single-camera sitcoms